No God may also refer to:

 "No God", a song by Hot Chip from the 2019 album A Bath Full of Ecstasy
 "No God", a song by Band-Maid from the 2021 album Unseen World
 Nogod, a Japanese heavy metal band

See also
 Atheism, absence of belief in the existence of deities